Penny to a Million is a primetime American television game show (at the time more commonly called a "quiz show") that aired on ABC from May 4 to October 19, 1955 on Wednesday nights, for alternating sponsors (Brown & Williamson's Raleigh cigarettes, and W.A. Sheaffer Pen Company). The pilot was hosted by Bud Collyer, but was replaced by Bill Goodwin when it became a series.

Format
Two rounds of regular game play were in each episode. In each round, four new contestants selected from the audience took turns answering questions. The first correct answer added one cent to the jackpot, with each subsequent correct answer doubling the jackpot; if a contestant gave a wrong answer or failed to answer, they were eliminated from the game, awarded a gift certificate or savings bond ($25 for the first two eliminated, $50 for the round's runner-up) and a pack of cigarettes or a pen, depending on the show's sponsor. Wrong answers did not affect the jackpot. The round continued until three of the four contestants were eliminated or 20 questions were answered correctly (for a jackpot of up to 219¢, rounded down to 500,000 pennies). The jackpot reset to zero after each round.

Questions were separated into categories. As long as each contestant answered correctly, the next question would be of the same category; lines of questioning began with the easiest questions first, becoming progressively more difficult with each question. After a wrong answer, a new category would be introduced, and the process began again. For musical categories (identifying tunes was a recurring question format), a big band was on hand to perform short snippets.

The winners of each round competed in the playoff round, where the jackpots from each round were added together. The two players took turns answering questions until at least one of them missed a question. If they both missed a question in turn, they both split the pot evenly. If one player correctly answered a question and the other missed, the winner won three-quarters of the pot while the runner-up received the remaining quarter of the pot.

The show's name comes from its concept: the smallest prize was 1¢, and the highest prize the show offered was "a million pennies," or $10,000. The rules of the game ensured that only $7,500 of that top prize could be won by any particular contestant.

Episode status
At least five episodes are known to exist, including the pilot.

External links
Penny to a Million at IMDb
Penny to a Million description, photos, and video clips at tvparty.com
'Episode from October 1955 available for download at the Internet Archive
1955 American television series debuts
1955 American television series endings
1950s American game shows
American Broadcasting Company original programming